The Hotel Métropole is a currently closed five-star luxury hotel in central Brussels, Belgium. It was built in 1872–1874 in an eclectic style with neo-Renaissance and Louis XVI influences. The hotel opened in 1895 and was the only 19th-century hotel still in operation in Brussels, until it closed due to the COVID-19 pandemic in April 2020, after 125 years of continuous operation. The hotel had 251 rooms and 22 spacious suites. It was sold in 2022 and the new owners announced plans to restore it and reopen it in 2025.

The hotel is located at 31, place de Brouckère/De Brouckèreplein, next to the Boulevard Adolphe Max/Adolphe Maxlaan and the Northern Passage glazed shopping arcade, as well as Brussels' busiest shopping street; the Rue Neuve/Nieuwstraat. This area is served by the metro and premetro (underground tram) station De Brouckère on lines 1, 3, 4 and 5.

History

Origins and early history
Under the reign of King Leopold II, following the covering of the river Senne (1867–1871), Brussels was remodelled with large boulevards and green avenues. The then-mayor of the City of Brussels, Jules Anspach, contributed to the transformation of the urban landscape of the capital by the realisation of thoroughfares from the North Station to the South Station, including from south to north and from west to east: the /, the Boulevard Anspach/Anspachlaan, the Boulevard Adolphe Max/Adolphe Maxlaan, and the /.

In 1890, Prosper and Edouard Wielemans, two brothers with a brewing company, opened the Café Métropole on the Place de Brouckère/De Brouckèreplein—a major square on the new boulevards—as a place to sell their beer. The café was a huge success, and in 1891, the Wielemans-Ceuppens family purchased the next-door building, a former property of the Caisse générale d'épargne et de retraite (ASLK/CGER), and turned it into the Hotel Métropole, inaugurated in 1895. This main building had been built in 1872–1874 by the architect . The hotel's former reception desk is still easily recognisable today as the former bank's desk, a significant historical and heritage glimpse of the past.

Following their purchase, the Wielemans brothers commissioned the French architect , who was already responsible for the decoration of the Café Métropole, to design a luxurious hotel of international class. Cambon called upon the best artists and craftsmen of the time to assist him in his work. Nowadays, Chambon's design is still a prominent feature of the heritage hotel, which is considered an important historical landmark in the city. Not only was the Hotel Métropole one of the first luxury hotels, it was also the first to have electricity and central heating, and was until 2020 the only surviving 19th century hotel in Brussels.

20th century
In the 20th century, the hotel was enlarged by successive annexations of neighbouring buildings to occupy almost the entire block between the Place de Brouckère, the /, the Rue Neuve/Nieuwstraat, and the Northern Passage glazed shopping arcade, and split by the /. The most remarkable extension was that of the 3000-seater Métropole Cinema, carried out in Art Deco style by the architect  and inaugurated in 1932, which included a projection room, a tavern, shops, a disco La Frégate and two floors of supplementary hotel rooms with a patio above the cinema.

The Hotel Métropole is famous for having hosted numerous national and international events, including the first Solvay Conference on Physics and on Chemistry in 1911, which brought together personalities such as Einstein, Marie Curie and Henri Poincaré. Moreover, it is the birthplace of the Black Russian cocktail, which was created in 1949 by the barman Gustave Tops for the United States ambassador to Luxembourg, Perle Mesta.

During the Second World War's occupation of Belgium, the Hotel Métropole was requisitioned by the Germans forces, then for a year by the Allied Forces. After the war, the hotel experienced another golden era. Great statesmen, artists and entertainers visiting Brussels all stayed at the hotel: Eisenhower, the General De Gaulle, the Shah, Jacques Brel, Maurice Chevalier, to name a few. Toots Thielemans made his debut in the jazz orchestra that played in the Café Métropole. Annie Cordy also had her own suite in the hotel.

In the second half of the 20th century, the hotel underwent more renovation works. In 1985, Le Bar 19ème and the restaurant L'Alban Chambon were opened. Ten years later, the hotel celebrated its centenary.

21st century
Since 28 February 2002, the hotel's facade and ground floor, as well as the Belle Époque elevator and ironwork, have been protected by the Monuments and Sites Directorate of the Brussels-Capital Region. That same year, the restaurant was completely renovated giving it an Italian Baroque décor.

Since 29 June 2015, the hotel stands at the edge of a large pedestrian zone in central Brussels. It however remains directly accessible by car via the Rue Fossé aux Loups and the /. It is also served by the metro and premetro (underground tram) station De Brouckère on lines 1, 3, 4 and 5

The hotel faced severe financial difficulties after the drop in tourism due to the 2016 Brussels bombings. It closed in April 2020, due to the outbreak of the COVID-19 pandemic. In 2021, it was announced that the closure would be permanent. , its former brasserie, the Café Métropole, located next door, remained in use.

In November 2022, the Métropole's owners, the Bervoets family, sold it to the American private equity firm Lone Star Funds for €100 million (€400,000 per room). The new owners announced that the hotel would be thoroughly renovated and would reopen in 2025, managed by Centaurus Hospitality Management.

Building
The hotel's facade, in eclectic style with an Italian neo-Renaissance dominance, has three levels and nine bays, crowned by an attic balustrade which was maintained during the 19th-century transformation into the hotel, but was raised by two levels under a mansard roof, as today. The current modern awning, originally in iron and glass, spans the entire width of the facade and is rounded in a barrel above the entrance.

The hotel's reception, lobby, and lounge are overtly ornate in an eclectic style of French Renaissance character, with Corinthian columns, rich furnishings, gilded details, and chandeliers, largely preserved in the state made by Chambon. Similarly, the hotel's eleven meetings and conference rooms are decorated in a neo-Renaissance style. The lobby is lit by a skylight, and still conserves its original elevator and main iron staircase.

The hotel offers eating possibilities in the Café Métropole brasserie and Le Jardin Indien breakfast room. It also has a bar, Le 31, with a late 19-century style décor, as well as a fitness room.

See also
 Corinthia Grand Hotel Astoria
 Hotel Le Plaza, Brussels
 History of Brussels
 Belgium in "the long nineteenth century"

References

Notes

Bibliography

External links

 Official website
 A list of famous guests who have stayed at the Métropole
 Pure Heritage Hotels

Metropole
City of Brussels
Buildings and structures in Brussels
Protected heritage sites in Brussels
Metropole
Heritage hotels
1895 establishments in Belgium
2022 mergers and acquisitions